India Grangier (born 5 January 2000) is a French professional racing cyclist, who currently rides for UCI Women's Continental Team . Grangier has been a member of the team since 2018, including its first UCI season in 2019.

References

External links

2000 births
Living people
French female cyclists
Place of birth missing (living people)